Street Moves is the debut album by Dutch group Twenty 4 Seven. It was produced by Ruud van Rijen and released on the label BCM Records in 1990. Captain Hollywood performed the rap parts.

The album also features two singles, "I Can't Stand It!" and its follow-up "Are You Dreaming?". The latter includes a Bruce Forest remix of the song "I Can't Stand It!".

Track listing

 "I Can't Stand It" – 4:07 	
 "Whom Do You Trust?" – 5:37 	
 "In Your Eyes" – 4:27 	
 "Are You Dreaming?" – 4:56 	
 "Help 'Em Understand" – 4:01 	
 "Living In The Jungle" – 4:33 	
 "You Can Make Me Feel Good" – 4:13 	
 "Show Me Your Love Tonight" – 4:39 	
 "Find A Better Way" – 3:57 	
 "I Can't Stand It" (Bruce Forest Remix) – 3:35

Charts

Credits
Artwork by LWW 
Photography by Esser & Strauss Studios 
Producer – Jim Soulier, Ruud van Rijen 
Rap vocals – Captain Hollywood

References

External links
Twenty 4 Seven Featuring  Capt. Hollywood — Street Moves

1990 debut albums
Twenty 4 Seven albums